Kırıt is a village in Tarsus district of Mersin Province, Turkey. Turkish state highway  is to the east of the village. The population of Kırıt was 226  as of 2012.

References

Villages in Tarsus District